Gian Carlo Gamboa Sotto (born March 18, 1978) is a Filipino actor and politician who has served as the 18th vice mayor of Quezon City since 2019, under the mayoralty of Joy Belmonte. A member of the local Serbisyo sa Bayan Party, Sotto previously served as a member of the Quezon City Council from 2010 to 2019.

Early life 
Sotto was born on March 18, 1978, to Senate President Tito Sotto and actress Helen Gamboa. Belonging to the Sotto family of Philippine entertainment and politics, he is a grandson of former Senator Vicente Sotto. He is also the nephew of actor and television personality Vic Sotto, making him a cousin of actor Oyo Sotto and Pasig Mayor Vico Sotto.

Entertainment career
Sotto had several acting stints on films notably appearing alongside his uncle Vic Sotto's box-office hits and at television being formerly part of ABS-CBN's talent management Star Magic.

Sotto also became active as the vocalist of the prominent record label Ivory Music's rock band Nerveline.

Political career
In 2010, Sotto was elected to the Quezon City Council as a councilor for the third district. He was a member of the Liberal Party until he switched parties, joining  PDP–Laban on May 10, 2017. He would continue serving as councilor until 2019, where he was term-limited. 

In 2019, Sotto ran for the vice mayoralty of Quezon City as the running mate of Joy Belmonte. He entered a field of five candidates, which included fellow television personalities Roderick Paulate and Jopet Sison. On May 13, 2019, Sotto narrowly defeated his closest opponent —Sison— to become the city's eighteenth vice mayor. He was sworn in on June 30, 2019.

As vice mayor, he presides the Quezon City Council and also has the right to vote to break ties if there are disputes in ordinance proposals.

Personal life 
Sotto is married to Joy Woolbright-Sotto; they have six children. Beyond politics, Sotto is a Christian church leader and is also active as an entrepreneur.

References

Living people
1978 births
Quezon City Council members
Male actors from Metro Manila
Tagalog people
Filipino Christians
Filipino rock singers
Hugpong ng Pagbabago politicians
Gian